Felix Otto (born 14 June 1983 in Düsseldorf) is a German rower. He won the gold medal in the men's lightweight coxless pair at the 2006 World Rowing Championships.

References	 
 

1983 births
Living people
German male rowers
Sportspeople from Düsseldorf
World Rowing Championships medalists for Germany